In biology, a tribe is a taxonomic rank above genus, but below family and subfamily. It is sometimes subdivided into subtribes. By convention, all taxonomic ranks from genus upwards are capitalized, including both tribe and subtribe.

In zoology, the standard ending for the name of a zoological tribe is "-ini". Examples include the tribes Caprini (goat-antelopes), Hominini (hominins), Bombini (bumblebees), and Thunnini (tunas). The tribe Hominini is divided into subtribes by some scientists; subtribe Hominina then comprises "humans". The standard ending for the name of a zoological subtribe is "-ina".

In botany, the standard ending for the name of a botanical tribe is "-eae". Examples include the tribes Acalypheae and Hyacintheae. The tribe Hyacintheae is divided into subtribes, including the subtribe Massoniinae. The standard ending for the name of a botanical subtribe is "-inae".

In bacteriology, the form of tribe names is as in botany, e.g., Pseudomonadeae, based on the genus name Pseudomonas.

Rank recognition
An unfamiliar taxonomic rank cannot necessarily be identified as a tribe merely by the presence of one of the standard suffixes:
 zoological -ini uniquely suffixes the animal tribe, 
 zoological -ina uniquely suffixes the animal subtribe
 zoological -inae uniquely suffixes the animal subfamily
 botanical -eae also suffixes class -phyceae, suborder -ineae, family -aceae, and subfamily -oideae (these additional -eae ranks are present in bacteria, plants, algae, and fungi, but not animals)

Accordingly, working within animals alone, subfamily -inae, tribe -ini, and subtribe -ina are unique suffixes to their specific taxonomic ranks. At the other extreme, working within algae alone, -eae suffixes class -phyceae, suborder -ineae, family -aceae, subfamily -oideae, and tribe -eae. The longer suffixes themselves suffixed with -eae must first be eliminated before recognizing an unfamiliar -eae designation as belonging to rank tribe.

See also 
 Taxonomy (biology)
 Nomenclature codes

Notes

References 

 
Bacterial nomenclature
Tribe
Plant taxonomy
rank16